John Johnson ( – 1594) was an English lutenist, composer of songs and lute music, attached to the court of Queen Elizabeth I. He was the father of the lutenist and composer Robert Johnson.

Discography
The lutenist Lynda Sayce has recorded a disc of works by John Johnson and his son. Two pieces "Pavan" and "Gaillard" have been recorded by Julian Bream and John Williams. Christopher Wilson and Shirley Rumsey have made a recording on the Naxos label of John Johnson's lute music. A dozen pieces by Johnson were also recorded by lutenist and theorbist Yavor Genov in his album Orpheus Anglorum (Brilliant Classics, 2018).

References

External links
Music Collection in Cambridge Digital Library which contains early copies/examples of Johnson's compositions

1540s births
1594 deaths
16th-century English composers
English male composers
Composers for lute